Donald and the Wheel is a 17-minute Donald Duck animated short directed by Hamilton Luske, produced by Walt Disney and released on June 21, 1961. It is an educational-based film, and features a considerable amount of musical vocals. Disney described the cartoon as "Using the revolutionary Xerox and Sodium Screen Processes together for the first time, Disney and his director, Ham Luske, combine real people and objects in the same perspective as animated characters and objects."

Plot
Two "spirits of progress" are observing the potential inventor of the wheel. These spirits are never seen aside from their auras. One of these spirits is an adult (voiced by Thurl Ravenscroft) and is accompanied by his beatnik-talking son (voiced by Max Smith). The elder is trying to explain the importance of the wheel to his son. They observe a caveman (portrayed by Donald Duck) trying to haul his supply sled up a hill and into a cave. Donald is then chased out of the cave by a Saber Tooth Tiger. He gets away, but the tiger tumbles down a hill wrapped around a rock. The spirits tell Donald that this should be the inspiration for his invention of the wheel.

The film then goes into the evolution and widespread uses for the wheel, including those used by the Ancient Egyptians, Ancient Greeks, and Ancient Romans. It introduces the horse-drawn vehicles of the Middle Ages as well as buggies and carriages of the 19th century, culminating with the invention of the steam locomotive and the Industrial Revolution.

The narrators also take time to explain various devices that use wheel-based parts, including gears like a music box, a gramophone and a jukebox. Inside the jukebox, a tiny lady dances on the records contemporary jazz, hoedown and classic ballet with Donald joining in with her. The last few segments enter the 20th century and the rise of factories and the automobile. They finally reach the present day, wrapping up with satellites. They also explain that the world itself is a wheel, and that the Sun, Moon, Earth and planetary orbits act as wheels.

After seeing into the future, Donald appears overwhelmed and bewildered, and decides against inventing the wheel. He claims it is "too much trouble" and does not want to bear the enormous responsibility. The Spirits of Progress accept that Donald may not be the true inventor of the wheel, but that "somebody did".

Voice cast
 Clarence Nash as Donald Duck (voice)
 Thurl Ravenscroft as The Spirit of Progress / Narrator (voice)
 The Mellomen (vocals)

Music
The music was composed by Buddy Baker, who also composed Donald in Mathmagic Land and sung by The Mellomen.

Release
Donald and the Wheel was released in theaters with the movie The Parent Trap.

Home media
The short was released on November 11, 2008, on Walt Disney Treasures: The Chronological Donald, Volume Four: 1951-1961.

References

External links 
 

1960s educational films
1960s English-language films
1961 animated films
1961 short films
1960s Disney animated short films
Disney educational films
Films about ducks
Donald Duck short films
Films directed by Hamilton Luske
Films produced by Walt Disney
Films scored by Buddy Baker (composer)
Short films with live action and animation
Animated films set in prehistory
Films about cavemen
Animated films about cavemen
Transport films
American animated short films